Hemicladus decoratus is a species of beetle in the family Cerambycidae. It was described by Ernst Fuchs in 1955. It is known from Bolivia.

References

Calliini
Beetles described in 1955